United Kingdom environmental law concerns the protection of the environment in the United Kingdom. Environmental law is increasingly a European and an international issue, due to the cross border issues of air and water pollution, and man-made climate change.

History
In the common law, the primary protection was found in the tort of nuisance, but this only allowed for private actions for damages or injunctions if there was harm to land; thus issues such as smells emanating from pig sties, strict liability against dumping rubbish, or damage from exploding dams are included. Private enforcement, however, was limited and found to be woefully inadequate to deal with major environmental threats, particularly threats to common resources.

1306, Edward I briefly banned coal fires in London.
John Evelyn, Fumifugium (1661) argued for burning fragrant wood instead of mineral coal, which he believed would reduce coughing. 
Ballad of Gresham College (1661) describes how the smoke "does our lungs and spirits choke, Our hanging spoil, and rust our iron."
In 1800, one million tons of coal were burned in London, and 15 million across the UK.
Smoke Nuisance Abatement (Metropolis) Act 1853
John Snow in 1854 discovered that the water pump on Broad Street, Soho was responsible for 616 cholera deaths because it was contaminated by an old cesspit leaking fecal bacteria. Germ theory of disease began to replace miasma theory that had lingered since the Black Death.

During the "Great Stink" of 1858, the dumping of sewerage into the River Thames began to smell so ghastly in the summer heat that Parliament had to be evacuated. The Metropolitan Commission of Sewers Act 1848 had allowed the Metropolitan Commission for Sewers to close cesspits around the city in an attempt to "clean up" but this simply led people to pollute the river. In 19 days, Parliament passed a further Act to build the London sewerage system.

Alkali Act 1863 and Alkali Act 1874, amended 1906
WS Jevons, The Coal Question; An Inquiry Concerning the Progress of the Nation, and the Probable Exhaustion of Our Coal Mines (1865)
Ground Game Act 1880, Night Poaching Act 1828, Game Act 1831, game preservation
James Johnston (socialist politician), president of the Smoke Abatement League, international conference in 1911.

London also suffered from terrible air pollution, and this culminated in the "Great Smog" of 1952, which in turn triggered a legislative response: the Clean Air Act 1956. The basic regulatory structure was to set limits on emissions for households and business (particularly burning coal) while an inspectorate would enforce compliance. It required zones for smokeless fuel to be burned and relocated power stations.

Clean Air Act 1968 required tall chimneys to disperse pollution.

Environmental protection

Environment Act 1995
Environmental Damage Regulations (2015) - implement the EU's Environmental Liability Directive 2004/35/EC, originally introduced in 2009 and revised in 2015.

Pollution
Control of Pollution Act 1974
Environmental Protection Act 1990

Wildlife
Wildlife and Countryside Act 1981
Weeds Act 1959
Badgers Act 1991
Protection of Badgers Act 1992
Hunting Act 2004

Conservation
Planning (Listed Buildings and Conservation Areas) Act 1990
National Parks and Access to the Countryside Act 1949
National parks of England and Wales and National parks of Scotland
Ancient Monuments and Archaeological Areas Act 1979
Countryside and Rights of Way Act 2000

Climate change
Climate Change Act 2008
Planning and Energy Act 2008
Energy Act 2008
Energy Act 2010
Energy Act 2011

See also Environment Agency

European and international law
European Commissioner for the Environment
European Climate Change Programme
Water Framework Directive
Birds Directive
Habitats Directive
United Nations Environment Programme

See also
English land law
UK enterprise law
Environmental law
Environmental racism in Europe
Conservation in the United Kingdom
List of environmental laws by country

References

English land law